Koltunovka is a rural locality (a selo) in Alexeyevsky District, Belgorod Oblast, Russia. The population was 388 as of 2010. There are 12 streets.

Geography 
Koltunovka is located 8 km northeast of Alexeyevka (the district's administrative centre) by road. Alexeyevka is the nearest rural locality.

References 

Rural localities in Alexeyevsky District, Belgorod Oblast
Biryuchensky Uyezd